The FIS Nordic World Ski Championships 1984 for teams in Ski jumping and Nordic combined took place in Engelberg, Switzerland and Rovaniemi, Finland. These were extraordinary events because both were not held at the 1984 Winter Olympics in Sarajevo.

Nordic combined 3 × 10 km team
March 17, 1984

Venue: Rovaniemi, Finland

Ski jumping team large hill 
February 26, 1984

Venue: Engelberg, Switzerland

Medal table

References
1984 team nordic combined results from Rovaniemi, Finland
 Hofer, Walter (FIS Race Director Ski Jumping). "AW: 1984 Team Large Hill Competition in Engelberg, SUI." E-Mail to Chris Miller. 7 Aug 2006.

1984 in Nordic combined
FIS Nordic World Ski Championships
February 1984 sports events in Europe
March 1984 sports events in Europe
Sports competitions in Rovaniemi
Engelberg
Nordic skiing competitions in Switzerland
Nordic skiing competitions in Finland